Team Ireland was a stock car racing team that competed in the NASCAR Winston Cup Series between 1991 and 1992. Owned by Irishman Martin Birrane, the team posted a best finish of thirteenth with driver Bobby Hillin Jr.

Winston Cup Series

Car No. 31 history

Team Ireland made its debut in the 1991 NASCAR Winston Cup Series season, competing in four races with the No. 53 Chevrolet; the team intended to field IndyCar driver John Paul Jr. in its cars, but after Paul proved to have a hard time adjusting to the heavy NASCAR cars, he was replaced after two races by Bobby Hillin Jr., who joined the team for a planned 15-race schedule in 1992. Changing to the No. 31 and using cars and engines supplied by Richard Childress Racing, the team competed in ten races during the 1992 NASCAR Winston Cup Series season, posting a best finish of 13th in the Coca-Cola 600 at Charlotte Motor Speedway, before being forced to close due to a lack of sponsorship; the team was unable to pay a fine levied by NASCAR for the use of illegal cylinder heads in the Mello Yello 500 in October, and team owner Birrane chose to leave the sport.

References

External links

Defunct NASCAR teams
Auto racing teams established in 1991
1992 disestablishments in the United States
1991 establishments in the United States